The 1956 North Carolina gubernatorial election was held on November 6, 1956. Incumbent Democrat Luther H. Hodges defeated Republican nominee Kyle Hayes with 66.95% of the vote. 

This election was unusual for North Carolina at the time, in that a sitting Governor ran for another term. The Constitution of North Carolina at the time had a one-term limit for governors, but Hodges, as lieutenant governor, had succeeded William B. Umstead after the latter died in office, and was running for a full four-year term on his own. In 1977, the state's voters approved an amendment to the state constitution permitting the governor to serve two consecutive four-year terms.

Primary elections
Primary elections were held on May 26, 1956.

Democratic primary

Candidates
Luther H. Hodges, incumbent Governor
Thomas B. Sawyer
Harry P. Stokely
C.E. Earle Jr.

Results

General election

Candidates
Luther H. Hodges, Democratic
Kyle Hayes, Republican

Results

References

1956
North Carolina
Gubernatorial